The Oracle Zero Data Loss Recovery Appliance (Recovery Appliance or ZDLRA) is a computing platform that includes Oracle Corporation (Oracle) Engineered Systems hardware and software built for backup and recovery of the Oracle Database. It performs continuous data protection, validates backups, automatically corrects many issues, and provides alerts when backups fail validation. 

It is designed for Oracle databases and works only on Oracle databases. It is considered a 3rd party backup and recovery product. Industry analyst firm ESG (via ESG Lab) reviewed it and noted that it "meets the needs of the financial services industry" and provided what they call “Fiduciary Class Data Recovery” to meet the "high level of trust required by financial institutions".

It was introduced in 2014 as part of Oracle Corporation's family of "Engineered Systems" and shares components with the Oracle Exadata Database Machine, with an additional layer of software that provides specific features for backup, recovery, replication, monitoring, and management. Like the Oracle Exadata Database Machine, it is periodically refreshed as a new interoperable and expandable “generation” based on newer hardware technology at the time of release.  In September 2019, the Recovery Appliance X8M introduced a 100 Gbit/s internal network fabric based on RoCE (RDMA over Converged Ethernet), replacing the InfiniBand fabric used in previous Recovery Appliance generations.

The Recovery Appliance elastic configuration starts with a "Base Rack" that can be incrementally increased to a "Full Rack" or larger "multi-rack" configuration configurationsconfigurationconfigurations. A Base Rack is capable of managing over 207 terabytes of backup data, while a Full Rack can manage over 1.26 petabytes.  Multi-Rack configurations of up to 18 racks wide can manage more than 22 petabytes of data. Since Recovery Appliance only needs to store data that has changed, the actual size of databases that are protected can be many times larger than the storage capacity of a Recovery Appliance.

References

External links 
https://www.oracle.com/engineered-systems/zero-data-loss-recovery-appliance/index.html
https://juliandontcheff.wordpress.com/2014/10/30/oracle-zero-data-loss-recovery-appliance/
https://dl.acm.org/citation.cfm?id=3002738
https://docs.oracle.com/cd/E55822_01/index.htm
http://www.oracle.com/technetwork/database/features/availability/zero-data-loss-recovery-appliance-2766885.html
https://www.youtube.com/watch?v=Wq2H2un84EA
https://www.doag.org/formes/pubfiles/8565375/2016-MW-Konrad_Haefeli-Zero_Data_Loss_Recovery_Appliance-_in_Action_-Praesentation.pdf
https://siliconangle.com/2016/11/25/ready-new-data-recovery-regulations/

Zero Data Loss Recovery Appliance
Zero Data Loss Recovery Appliance